The 2013 Men's World Junior Squash Championships is the men's edition of the 2013 World Junior Squash Championships, which serves as the individual world Junior championship for squash players. The event took place at the Hasta La Vista Club in Wroclaw in Poland from 16 to 21 July 2013. Karim El Hammamy won his first World Junior Open title, defeating Fares Dessouky in the final.

Seeds

Draw and results

Finals

Top half

Section 1

Section 2

Bottom half

Section 1

Section 2

Source:

See also
2013 Women's World Junior Squash Championships
British Junior Open Squash
World Junior Squash Championships

References

External links
Men's World Junior Championships 2013 official website
Men's World Junior Championships 2013 SquashSite website

2013 in squash
World Junior Squash Championships
2013 in Polish sport
Squash tournaments in Poland
International sports competitions hosted by Poland